Idka AB is a collaborative platform headquartered in Sweden. Idka allows you to connect, share, store and share documents and files, while keeping your data completely safe. Idka is advertising-free, and fully encrypted. The solution combines all of the functionality of social media in one place, and will never share or sell information. The user controls the sharing.

Idka, which is available as an HTML5 web service, requires no IT knowledge or support, and no installation of any kind except for apps on iOS and Android.

Idka announced on Twitter, on April 21, 2020, that they were shutting down.

Background
Idka was founded upon the belief that the advertising-driven model cannot be fixed, contrary to what Facebook and others have said. Idka is the antithesis to the 'Stalker Economy', the foundation of today's social networking, were the users themselves are the product. The built-in drivers of the advertising model will inevitably lead to serious privacy violations, but more than that, it creates a problem for a free democratic way of life. The problem of tailored news (echo chambers), dark posts, political ‘nudging’ and covert political campaigning, profiling and surveillance is real and has already had discernible impact.

Description
Idka has been created as a product in its own right, where users pay a small monthly subscription for a service with short, understandable, and fair user terms.

The service is free of advertising, news streams, and manipulation. Idka centers on privacy and security, so encryption and 2-factor authentication is central. All default actions are set up to protect the user's privacy. There is no pre-population or prompting to invite or collect friends and contacts. A post will not be shared when published without an intended and specific share action from the user. A private post cannot be changed and shared with new people. People who are added to a many-to-many chat will be able to see chat entries after they are added, etc. A picture in a post cannot be downloaded and it goes away if removed by the person who uploaded it. Delete is really delete, meaning that the information is removed from Idka servers.

The service covers a number of functions that are otherwise spread across several platforms, such as posting, chatting with end-to-end encryption (like Telegram and Signal), many-to-many chatting (like hang-out), integrated drag&drop cloud storage (like Box and DropBox) without file size limits, etc. When a group is created, it will immediately have its own cloud storage, its own chat and posting wall. Members can be read-only if necessary.

The service also caters to companies with ‘organizational accounts’ and provides more functionality than other web services (such as Slack).

References

External links
 
 

Companies based in Stockholm
Online companies of Sweden
Multilingual websites
Proprietary cross-platform software
Real-time web
Swedish social networking websites
Text messaging